This is a summary of the year 2009 in the Irish music industry.

Summary

January 
 On 6 January, it was revealed that a track from Enya's album And Winter Came... was to feature in a Japanese television drama. "Dreams Are More Precious" is the theme tune for Arifureta Kiseki, the first episode of which aired on Fuji Television on 8 January.
 On 14 January, the nominations for the Choice Music Prize were announced.
 From January 15–17, The Coronas and Fight Like Apes represented Ireland in the Eurosonic Festival in Groningen, Netherlands. Former Clann Zú member Declan de Barra also performed, having received an invitation directly from the organisers.
 On 16 January, State, launched in March 2008, announced it was to cease publication of its print edition due to difficulties in attracting advertising revenue. It said it would continue as an online entity.
 On 18 January, U2 were amongst the performers at the concert preceding Barack Obama's inauguration as the 44th President of the United States. They played "Pride (In the Name of Love)", a song which references the assassination of Martin Luther King Jr., and "City of Blinding Lights".
 On 19 January, Dave Fanning conducted the worldwide premiere of the U2 single "Get on Your Boots" on The Colm & Jim-Jim Breakfast Show on RTÉ 2fm.
 On 20 January, it was reported that thousands of euro worth of equipment owned by the band Fred had been stolen from their van parked across from Anglesea Garda Station in Cork, just as the band were to begin a North American tour. The missing gear was recovered within 48 hours.
 On 28 January, the 2009 Meteor Music Awards was launched and the nominations announced.
Also on 28 January, Kings of Leon became the first act scheduled to appear at Oxegen 2009 to be announced. It was the second consecutive year in which this occurred.
 On 30 January, four more acts were announced for Oxegen 2009. These were Snow Patrol, Katy Perry, Bloc Party and The Script.

February 
 On 1 February, the Irish Music Rights Organisation (IMRO) took over the administration of the rights of the Irish mechanical rights society, MCPSI.
 On 5 February, the reformed Blur were announced as one of Oxegen 2009's headliners in what will be their only Irish appearance of the year and their first in Ireland since three shows in the Olympia Theatre, Dublin in 2003.
 The Priest Feast Tour featuring Judas Priest, Megadeth and Testament played two Irish shows in February 2009, prior to the start of its seven-concert UK run. The dates were February 10 at the O2 in Dublin and February 11 at the Odyssey Arena in Belfast.
 On 12 February, RTÉ 2XM featured the world premiere of the title track from U2's No Line on the Horizon album.
 On Friday, 13 February, the Irish-owned music channel Bubble Hits burst.
 Also on 13 February, ten more acts were announced for Oxegen 2009: Pete Doherty, Razorlight, Nick Cave and the Bad Seeds, Elbow, Yeah Yeah Yeahs, The Ting Tings, White Lies, Fight Like Apes, Pendulum and Jason Mraz.
 On 15 February, the Irish Film and Television Awards took place in the Burlington Hotel in Dublin. David Holmes won an IFTA for his Hunger score, whilst Maria Doyle Kennedy won in the Best Supporting Actress category for her part in The Tudors.
 On 16 February, the 20-store Irish music retail chain, Golden Discs, entered examinership with debts of €9.5 million.
 On 19 February, a new batch of acts, including Blondie, Simple Minds, Crosby, Stills & Nash, Bell X1, Des Bishop and Mick Flannery/John Spillane, were announced for Live at the Marquee in Cork.
 Kaiser Chiefs did the O2 on 19 February, with support from Black Kids.
 The Killers played the O2, Dublin on February 20, 2009, as part of a UK and Ireland arena tour. Tickets for the entire tour sold out within hours after going on sale on 10 October 2008. The band opened the show with their single "Spaceman", with the encore including "When You Were Young".
 U2 brought London to a standstill on 27 February, the same day of the Irish release of their album No Line on the Horizon. The band performed a surprise rooftop show in front of 5,000 fans during the evening rush hour on top of the Broadcasting House in Regent Street, consisting of the songs "Get on Your Boots", "Magnificent", "Vertigo" and "Beautiful Day".
 Snow Patrol did the O2 on 28 February.

March 
 U2 released their twelfth studio album No Line on the Horizon internationally on 2 March 2009. It was released in five editions – standard CD, double vinyl and three limited editions. The band then embarked on a world tour following the release of what was the follow-up to their 2004 album, How to Dismantle an Atomic Bomb. It was claimed that the band would play three shows in Croke Park, Dublin in front of 240,000 people. In January the band warned fans against buying fake concert tickets from bogus websites. From 2 – 6 March, the band partake in a week-long residency on the Late Show with David Letterman, a television talk show in the United States.
 On 3 March, eleven new acts were added to the line-up for Oxegen 2009. These were Lady Gaga, Manic Street Preachers, Florence and the Machine, TV on the Radio, The Game, Ladyhawke, James, Foals, Of Montreal, Friendly Fires and Squeeze.
 On 4 March, the Choice Music Prize for Irish Album of the Year 2008 was awarded to Jape for the album, Ritual, during a live ceremony at Vicar Street, Dublin.
 On 5 March, Oxegen 2009 was officially launched, with an initial stage breakdown unveiled and a number of new acts announced. These included Nine Inch Nails, Jane's Addiction, Pet Shop Boys, Glasvegas, The Saturdays, Doves, Eagles of Death Metal and God Is an Astronaut.
 On 9 March, U2 announced details of their World Stadium Tour with approximately 25 shows in Europe and 25 in North America before Christmas. European ticket sales commenced on 14 – 15 March with the Irish leg due to consist of a three-night run in Croke Park, Dublin on 24, 25, 27 July. The band said they would play surrounded by their audience.
From 13 to 22 March, nearly twenty Irish acts performed at South by Southwest in Austin, Texas, United States.
 On 17 March, the 2009 Meteor Awards took place at the RDS in Dublin. The Script won two awards, Best Irish Band and Best Irish Band for their self-titled debut album.
Also on 17 March, "In the Name of the Grandfather", an episode of The Simpsons guest starring Glen Hansard premiered in Ireland ahead of its U.S. broadcast, the first time that this had ever happened. The episode sees the Simpsons travelling to Ireland where a drunken Homer and Grandpa buy a pub.
On 20 March, tickets for U2's first two Croke Park shows on 24 and 25 July sold out within forty minutes of going on sale, with a third show announced within five days.
 According to the Daily Mirror, Tina Turner would perform two shows at the newly refurbished Point Theatre, Dublin in 2009. A third concert was added at a later date. Tickets were expected to go on sale in August 2008 and might have cost up to €150. Hot Press concluded that Turner would be in Dublin for a theatre show in March 2009 but was less certain of the venue, stating that it was likely to take place at the refurbished Point. Turner, who officially retired from live performance eight years ago, decided to tour again after performing at the Grammys with Beyoncé. “The response was overwhelming,” she said. “Everywhere I went people were asking me when I was going back on tour again. So after a lot of thought and planning we announced an American tour. Now Europe beckons!” On 28 August 2008, after three months of uncertainty, a 26 March date was announced, with tickets (priced between €91.25 and €156.25) going on sale on Thursday 4 September 2008.

April 
 On 15 April, Electric Picnic 2009 was launched, with acts announced including Orbital, The Flaming Lips, Basement Jaxx, Madness, Klaxons, Bell X1, Fleet Foxes and MGMT.
 On 17 April, tickets for Electric Picnic 2009 went on sale.
 On 18 April, AC/DC played the O2, Dublin as part of their Black Ice World Tour. When tickets, priced €67.70, went on sale on 17 October 2008 – the same day that their first studio album in eight years, Black Ice, was released in Ireland – they sold out within two minutes flat.
 On 22 April, the line-up for Castlepalooza 2009 was announced, including David Kitt, Dark Room Notes, Project Jenny, Project Jan, R.S.A.G., Channel One, Robotnik, The Lost Brothers, Noise Control, 8 Ball, Glint and Le Galaxie.
 On 28 April, Calvin Harris, Noisettes, The Saw Doctors, The Coronas, The Blizzards, The Answer, The Horrors, Iglu & Hartly, Starsailor and Spinnerette were added to the Oxegen 2009 line-up. La Roux cancelled citing "touring commitments.

May 
 On 5 May, the full line-up for 2009's Slane Concert was announced. It included The Prodigy, Kasabian and The Blizzards being announced as support acts for headliner, Oasis.
 On 5–6 May, Bob Dylan played two shows at the O2, Dublin.
 On 7 May, more dance acts, including Felix da Housecat and The Japanese Popstars, were announced for Oxegen 2009.
 On 13 May, Brian Wilson, Röyksopp, Amadou & Mariam, The Wailers, Fionn Regan, Mundy, James Murphy and Pat Mahoney of LCD Soundsystem, A Flock of Seagulls, Bell Orchestre, The Field, Jeffrey Lewis, Marina and the Diamonds and Richmond Fontaine were announced for Electric Picnic 2009.
 On 14 May, the 2009 Indie-pendence was launched, with headliners Super Furry Animals and Ocean Colour Scene amongst the initial acts announced. Admission fees were charged for the first time as the festival lost its free status.
 Also on 14 May, Therapy?, Tinchy Stryder, Boys Noize and Fever Ray (Karin Dreijer Andersson of The Knife) were all announced for Oxegen 2009.
 From 14 to 17 May, The Great Escape took place in Brighton, England. Irish acts to perform included Bell X1, Villagers, And So I Watch You from Afar, Fight Like Apes, Valerie Francis, Panama Kings, Angel Pier, Iain Archer and General Fiasco.
 On 29 May, the line-up for the 2009 Le Chéile was announced, featuring Lisa Hannigan, Delorentos, Fight Like Apes, Mundy, Declan O'Rourke and Jason Byrne.

June 
 Ex Revs front man Rory Gallagher won the award of Best Album of 2009 from Lanzarote's English language radio station UKawayFM for his solo album God Bless the Big Bang.
 On 6 June, Elton John played Thomond Park in Limerick.
 On June 12, Def Leppard and Whitesnake played the O2 Arena with support from Journey and Tesla.
 On June 13, Take That played Croke Park with support from The Script.
 Slane 2009 took place on 20 June. It was headlined by Oasis with support from The Prodigy. Kasabian, Glasvegas and The Blizzards also performed.
 Live at the Marquee took place in Cork in June and July.
 On 22 June, the full line-up for Indie-pendence was announced. Panama Kings, Pocket Promise, SetMaker, Nicole Maguire and Gillian Verrechia were added on 26 June 2009.
 The death of Michael Jackson on 25 June 2009 led to reactions from Ireland. Hot Press made its three Jackson covers (from 1984, 1987 and 1988) available for download and promised to upload the interviews to its site. Louis Walsh, a fan, told Hot Press that he "purposely avoided the media in the immediate aftermath of Jackson's death, as he didn't want to be quoted as an expert on the life of a man he'd only met once". Mick Pyro dubbed Jackson "the best singer who ever sang on record". The Edge spoke of meeting him.
 From 26 to 28 June, several Irish musical acts performed at Glastonbury Festival, including Fight Like Apes (Queen's Head Stage on 28 June), General Fiasco (John Peel Stage on 26 June), Lisa Hannigan, Two Door Cinema Club, Imelda May, Sharon Corr, In Case of Fire and The Script.
 AC/DC played Punchestown Racecourse, County Kildare on 28 June, their biggest Irish show to date and their first in the country since 1996. It was described beforehand as "one of the biggest outdoor concerts of the summer". They were supported by Thin Lizzy and The Answer. Thin Lizzy later cancelled after drummer Tommy Aldridge broke his collarbone in a cycling accident, with The Blizzards taking their place at short notice.
 On 30 June, U2 began their U2 360° Tour, their first world tour for three years, with a show at the Camp Nou in Barcelona. They played under a fifty metre tall "claw" covered in lasers in front of 90,000 people. Dave Fanning described it as "perfect, you couldn't ask for more [...] fantastic [...] an amazing show".

July 
 On 4 July, Rod Stewart played Thomond Park in Limerick.
 Oxegen 2009 took place from July 10–12 at Punchestown Racecourse in Naas, County Kildare.
On 12 July, Bruce Springsteen played the RDS in Dublin. The show began at 20:05 and lasted for three hours, with thirty songs being played.
U2 360° Tour at Croke Park
U2 played Croke Park, Dublin on 24, 25 and 27 July, supported by Glasvegas and Damien Dempsey, Kaiser Chiefs and Republic of Loose, Bell X1 and The Script respectively. RTÉ 2fm played archived interviews with Dave Fanning from 1979 to 2009 before the shows began.
Gates opened at 18:00 for the first show on the 24th, with 23 songs being performed, including "The Unforgettable Fire" (rarely played live), and references to Brendan Behan, The Beatles, The Clash, The Corrs, The Rolling Stones and a speech by Archbishop Desmond Tutu included on the night. Those in attendance wore a mask bearing the image of Aung San Suu Kyi when U2 played their song "Walk On", whilst there was a tribute to Ronnie Drew as well. Bono referred to Hill 16 as the "rubble of revolution". The last songs of the night were "With or Without You" and "Moment of Surrender".
The final show on the 26th coincided with heavy traffic as a result of the rush hour, the opening of an IKEA store in Ballymun and a new bus gate operating for the first time in College Green.
There were protests afterwards by disgruntled residents who objected to the quick dismantling of the stage in preparation for several football matches scheduled to take place at the venue the following weekend. There were fears that the next show on the tour in Gothenburg would have to be cancelled due to the delay.
Fourteen U2 albums occupied the Irish Albums Chart following their Croke Park shows, whilst The Script, one of the acts who supported U2, reached 52 consecutive weeks in the same chart on 7 August.
On 21 July, Lisa Hannigan's Sea Sew album was nominated for the Mercury Prize. It lost to Speech Debelle's Speech Therapy album on 8 September 2009.
Le Chéile took place in Oldcastle, County Meath from 28 July until 3 August, featuring artists such as Lisa Hannigan, Mundy, Declan O'Rourke, Delorentos and Fight Like Apes.
On 30 July, Hot Press.com and RTÉ.ie hosted a live web transmission by Arctic Monkeys which featured tracks from their third album, Humbug. RTÉ.ie also webcast the animated video for Coldplay single "Strawberry Swing".
On 30 July, Noel Hogan revealed in a Hot Press interview that he had been sending "a few little bits" to fellow member of The Cranberries, Dolores O'Riordan, and indicated that the band may reform.

August 
 Metallica played Marlay Park, Dublin on 1 August in a show originally intended for Fairyhouse. Support was provided by Avenged Sevenfold, Alice in Chains, and Mastodon. The performance by Alice in Chains was named as the Ticket Gig of the Week by The Irish Times.
 Fatboy Slim played Marlay Park, Dublin on 2 August, with support from David Guetta, Dizzee Rascal and Calvin Harris. Zane Lowe was also due to appear but pulled out due to illness and was replaced with Bitches with Wolves. Fatboy Slim's first song at Marlay Park was "Praise You".
On 6 August, the line-up for Cois Fharraige was announced, with tickets going on sale on 11 August. It featured acts such as Doves, The Zutons, Newton Faulkner, Noah and the Whale, The Hold Steady, Stereo MCs, The Lightning Seeds and Jerry Fish & The Mudbug Club. The Blizzards and Laura Izibor were later added on 21 August.
On 8 August, U2 topped the Billboard Hot Tours list after five shows in the Amsterdam ArenA and Croke Park which grossed $41.3 million, more than twice as much as Madonna in second place.
On 14 August, it was thought that U2 had set a new attendance record for a Wembley Stadium concert during the first UK show of their U2 360° Tour. The previous figure was 5,000 less and was set in 1995 by Rod Stewart then equalled by Foo Fighters in 2008.
On 23 August, Snow Patrol headlined V Festival in Hylands Park, UK, after Oasis cancelled with viral laryngitis.

September 
 On 3 September, Peter Crawley of The Irish Times wrote a negative review of a Chris de Burgh concert in the Gaiety Theatre, Dublin in that newspaper. De Burgh later circulated a letter attacking the review and reviewer.
 Electric Picnic 2009 took place from September 4–6.
 Cois Fharraige took place from 11 – 13 September.
 On 14 September, Coldplay played the Phoenix Park in Dublin. Elbow and White Lies supported.
 On 23 September 2009, a report from the UK's Music Week revealed that The Corrs album Talk on Corners was the twentieth best selling album in that country's chart history and the top selling Irish album there. Albums by Snow Patrol and U2 also featured in the top fifty.
 24 September—Arthur's Day: The 250th anniversary of the signing of a lease by Arthur Guinness for a brewery at St James's Gate in Dublin. Events organised by Diageo get underway in Dublin, Kuala Lumpur, Lagos, New York and Yaoundé. International performers who came to Dublin for the occasion included Tom Jones, Ronnie Wood, The Kooks, Paolo Nutini and The Enemy. The British music magazine NME referred to it as a "piss-up in a brewery".
 On 24 September, U2 set a new all-time attendance record of 84,472 at their second concert at New York City's Giants Stadium during the American leg of their U2 360° Tour. They beat a previous record set by Pope John Paul II in 1995, announcing their achievement from the stage. They also announced their first ever appearances in Russia and Turkey for 2010. British fans, upon noticing a lack of any further dates in their country, began to speculate about the possibility of U2 "hitting the festival circuit" as the music weekly NME termed it.

October 
 On 3–4 October, The Music Show took place at the RDS, Dublin.
On 5 October, The Cranberries announced their first live shows since their reformation, a 19-date tour across several cities in Canada and the United States.
 On 10 October, Boyzone singer Stephen Gately dies while on holiday with partner Andrew Cowles in Majorca. He was 33.
 On 13 October, the reformed Spandau Ballet played the O2, Dublin in the first date of their planned world tour.
On 16 October, Dublin to Gaza – "One concert, two cities", a benefit concert being held in aid of the Gaza Strip's latest bombardment by Israel, took place in Dublin and be broadcast live in Gaza City. It was organised by documentary maker Dearbhla Glynn and featured performances from artists such as Kíla, Liam Ó Maonlaí and Shadia Mansour.
From 16 to 18 October, Hard Working Class Heroes took place.
On 25 October, U2 had their U2 360° Tour show from the Rose Bowl in Pasadena, California, U.S., streamed live on YouTube in sixteen countries, including Ireland.
On 31 October, a statue was erected in Tralee and an album, A Friend of Mine, was released in memory of Christie Hennessy as the second anniversary in December 2007 approaches.

November 
On 5 November, U2 performed a mini-concert comprising four songs at the Brandenburg Gate in Germany to celebrate the twentieth anniversary of the fall of the Berlin Wall as part of the MTV Europe Music Awards. A special wall was built to keep any unwanted people out for the occasion.
On 6 November, The Killers released Live from the Royal Albert Hall. The live DVD features footage from their headlining performance at Oxegen 2009.
On 15 November, Yusuf Islam opened his first world tour in 33 years at The O2, giving his debut Irish concert. The show was controversial, with many audience members walking out in protest at the performance. Yusuf returned to discuss the controversy on The Late Late Show the following month.

December 
 On 1 December, Vicar Street and Cyprus Avenue were the main winners at the Live Music Venue of The Year Awards.
 On 3 and 5 December, Horslips played their first live shows since 1980, at the Odyssey Arena, Belfast and the O2, Dublin.
On 4 December, early bird tickets for the 2010 Electric Picnic and Oxegen music festivals went on sale. Oxegen tickets went on sale at 2007 prices as the organisers attempted to generate interest.
 On 8 December, Sinéad O'Connor, in a letter to Hot Press, asked for the resignations of Pope Benedict XVI and Taoiseach Brian Cowen and for the Papal Nuncio to be expelled by the Government of Ireland, saying Church officials were "not fit to call themselves representatives of Christ. They represent nothing but evil anymore" and that Cowen had "no testicles in the matter" of clerical sexual abuse of children.
 On 10 December, Depeche Mode played the O2, Dublin. Tickets went on sale on 27 March, with 6,000 being sold within forty minutes.
 On 12 December, The Blizzards played the Olympia Theatre, Dublin, in their biggest headline show to date. The show sold out several months in advance. They were supported by Ever27.
 On 20 December, Paul McCartney played the O2, Dublin, in his first Irish concert since his May 2003 concert which was his first Irish show since he played with The Beatles in the 1960s. The concert was part of an eight-date tour called Good Evening Europe. The show was attended by industry professionals such as Ian Dempsey, Dave Fanning, Ryan Tubridy and Louis Walsh who flew in especially from the UK. Evening Herald reviewer Chris Wasser described the show as "an astonishing performance, and a late – but by all means, welcome – contender for gig of the year, if not the decade". Eamon Sweeney of the Irish Independent called it "one of the finest live performances of recent memory [...] It really doesn't get any better than this". Tony Clayton-Lea of The Irish Times said: "If there was one member of the audience who went home in a grumpy mood, then truly they were the Christmas Grinch".
On 24 December, Bono, Glen Hansard, Mundy and Damien Rice participated in a busking session on Grafton Street, Dublin alongside volunteers who were raising money for the Simon Community.

Bands disbanded 
Delorentos (announced on 17 February)
The Dagger Lees  (announced on 17 February)
Giveamanakick (announced 17 August)
Oppenheimer (announced on 12 December)

Bands reformed 
3/4 of The Cranberries
Little Palace
Delorentos (announced 22 April)
Bob Geldof and The Boomtown Rats (temporary)
The Lookalikes (temporary)
All quarters of The Cranberries (announced 26 August)

Albums & EPs 
Below is a list of notable albums & EPs released by Irish artists in Ireland in 2009.

{| class="wikitable"
|-
| Issue date || Album title || Artist || Source || Sales || Notes
|-
| __ January || A Fire to Scare the Sun || Declan de Barra || || || His second album, featuring Cora Venus Lunny, the RTÉ Symphony Orchestra’s James Dunne, Kíla’s Brian Hogan and Mary Barneccutt from the Vyvienne Long Band.
|-
| 26 January|| Some Kind of Kick || The Things || || || Released on Nicotine Records.
|-
| 5 February|| Dolls and Jigsaws || Aoife Moriarty ||  || ||
|-
| 6 February|| 100 Midnights || The Mighty Stef || || || Released on Firstborn Recordings.
|-
| 13 February|| Everyday Demons || The Answer ||  || || Released by Albert Productions.
|-
| 20 February|| Blue Lights on the Runway || Bell X1 ||  || ||
|-
| 20 February|| Coffee Houses || Television Room || || || Released on Faction Records.
|-
| 23 February|| Untitled || Estel ||  || ||
|-
| 27 February|| No Line on the Horizon || U2 ||  || 484,000 copies in its first week  || Artwork Debuted at the top of the US charts, the band's seventh number one album in that country. Debuted at #1 in the UK. #1 in thirty countries internationally. 
|-
| 6 March|| Hands || Emmet Scanlon and What the Good Thought || || ||
|-
| 6 March|| Aye Aye Aye Aye || The Kinetiks || || || Recorded with Gareth Mannix and featuring the lead track "Lightbulb" and bonus cuts of previous singles "Bite the Bullet" and "Shuffle Your Feet".
|-
| 7 March|| Beware of the God || Paranoid Visions ||  ||  || Eleven-track third album released three years after the band's official reformation, including the single "Missing in Action", which was one of the winners of the Hot Press/Tisch competition, the prize of which was a chance to have a professional quality music video made for them.
|-
| 9 March|| Let the Truth Be Told || Laura Izibor ||  || || Released on Atlantic Records.
|-
| 20 March|| And So I Watch You From Afar || And So I Watch You From Afar ||  || || Released on Smalltown America Records.
|-
| 20 March|| To The Pine Roots || Iain Archer ||  || || Full release to the nine-track album sold the previous year on the internet. Released on Black Records.
|-
| 20 March|| Trauma Themes Idiot Times || Jinx Lennon ||  || ||
|-
| 20 March|| Crooked Timber || Therapy? ||  || ||
|-
| 27 March|| The Nightsaver || David Kitt ||  || || Artwork and tracklisting. Kitt's sixth studio album.
|-
| __ April || TBA || The Brothers Movement || || || Debut album by the band formerly known as Mainline.
|-
| 10 April|| We Love You Dark Matter || Dark Room Notes ||  || || Released on Gonzo Records. Recorded over a fortnight in July 2008 in a London studio, it features reworked versions of old songs such as "Love Like Nicotine" and "Shake Shake My Ceiling", and lead single "Let's Light Fires". Artwork. 
|-
| 17 April|| Human Nature || Alphastates ||  || || Second studio album. Due for a U.S. release in late 2009.
|-
| 17 April|| Listen || Christy Moore ||  || || First studio album since 2005's Burning Times.
|-
| 17 April|| Strawberry Blood || Mundy ||  || || Fourth studio album. Artwork
|-
| 24 April|| The Beautiful Untrue || Jerry Fish and the Mudbug Club ||  || ||
|-
| 8 May|| I'll Wait for Sound || Director ||  || || Completed in LA in late 2008.
|-
| __ May || U2: Medium, Rare & Remastered || U2 ||  || || 2 CD package described as “a limited-edition collection of rare tracks and lost cuts spanning three decades in the studio”, containing songs such as "Love You Like Mad", "Smile", "Beautiful Ghost", "Xanax And Wine" and "Jesus Christ", previously only available as part of the digital The Complete U2 box set. Released on U2.com.
|-
| 15 May|| Transworld || Le Galaxie ||  || || Debut EP.
|-
| 29 May|| Pages || Julie Feeney ||  || || Artwork Launch details
|-
| 29 May|| Aliquot Strings || TUCAN ||  || || Debut album from the instrumental duo.
|-
| 30 May|| Fragile Things (EP) || The Ambiance Affair ||  || ||
|-
| 5 June|| Grenade || The Chapman Society ||  || || Debut five-track EP.
|-
| 5 June|| Perfect Stranger || The Chapters ||  || || Debut studio album.
|-
| 6 July|| Jiggery Pokery || The Duckworth Lewis Method ||  || || Neil Hannon/Thomas Walsh collaboration set to be the first Irish concept album about cricket. To be released on 1969 Records. Artwork
|-
| 24 July|| New Boots || Wallis Bird ||  || || Released on Rubyworks Records.
|-
| 2 August|| No Baggage || Dolores O'Riordan ||  || || Second solo album, released on Cooking Vinyl.
|-
| 28 August|| The Victory Dance || David Geraghty ||  || || Second solo album.
|-
| Unknown || Democracy of One || Colin Devlin ||  || ||
|-
| Autumn || TBA || The Aftermath || || || Worked on with Noel Hogan.
|-
| Autumn || TBA || D. C. Tempest ||  || || Debut album.
|-
| 11 September|| No Bird Sang || Ger Wolfe ||  || || Fifth album, produced by Peadar O'Riada, released on Raggedy Records, launched at Cork's Corner House Bar at 6 pm on Friday, September 11.
|-
| 18 September|| Trees Dream in Algebra || Codes || 
|-
| 18 September|| Colours || Reemo ||  || || Debut album, launched in The Village on Wexford Street, Dublin, on 26 September.
|-
| 18 September|| After the Wedding || Sanskrit ||  || || Artwork. Featuring banjos, accordions, trumpets and samples of the Pope's voice.
|-
| 25 September|| Tony Was an Ex-Con || The Coronas ||  || || Revealed at Oxegen 2009.
|-
| 28 September|| Singled Out || Eleanor McEvoy ||  || || Compilation album of 15 singles from McEvoy's four albums and her new single "Oh Uganda".
|-
| __ September || Proceeds || Neosupervital ||

|-
| __ September || TBA || Royseven || || || Completed in the band's own Dublin studio and released on Roadrunner Records.
|-
| 9 October|| You Can Make Sound || Delorentos ||  || ||  Artwork. Released on DeloRecords label through ADA Global distribution.
|-
| 10 October|| Analogue Droids (EP) || Cowboy X ||  || || Four-track EP, featuring the songs "Analogue Droids", "Squirrel Chase Ball", "Ed White's Glove" and "Villain In Disguise".
|-
| 23 October|| Strict Joy || The Swell Season ||  || || Featuring members of The Frames and recorded with producer Peter Katis in his Connecticut studio. US release due on 29 September 2009. General release date later pushed back from 25 September until 23 October 2009.
|-
| 26 October|| Yes Cadets (EP) || Yes Cadets ||  || || Follow-up to the quartet's debut single "Canada" which was released at the beginning of September 2009.
|-
| __ November || Live, Love, Lost It — NYC || Mark Geary ||  || || Live album recorded during the summer in New York City and released through Independent Records.
|-
| 9 November|| Up to Now || Snow Patrol ||  || ||
|-
| 13 November|| Sidney Maxwell Williamson (EP) || Heritage Centre ||  || ||
|-
| 11 December|| Little Revelations (rarities album); "Lucky Me", "My Villain Heart" and "Your Vandal (box set of EPs) || Duke Special ||  || ||
|}

 TBA – Sharon Corr (Spring 2009) 
 TBA – The Dagger Lees (Summer 2009) To be recorded early 2009 with Detroit producer Jim Diamond (The White Stripes, The Von Bondies and Electric Six).
 TBA – Hooray For Humans (Spring 2009)
 TBA – The Minutes
 TBA – Vyvienne Long
 Blood Is Not Enough – Myp et Jeep
 TBA – Supermodel Twins (2009) 
 Still Dangerous: Live at the Tower Theatre, Philadelphia – Thin Lizzy (2009) 

 Singles Below is a list of notable singles released by Irish artists in Ireland in 2009. Festivals 

 Oxegen 2009 
 Oxegen 2009 took place from 10 to 12 July. Tickets went on sale on 15 August 2008 and 6 March 2009. Snow Patrol, Blur, Kings of Leon and The Killers headlined a line-up which also featured Bloc Party, The Specials, Nine Inch Nails, Jane's Addiction, Pet Shop Boys, The Script, Katy Perry, Lily Allen, Elbow, Razorlight, Squeeze, Manic Street Preachers, Eagles of Death Metal, Nick Cave and the Bad Seeds, TV on the Radio, James, Keane, Doves, Pete Doherty, The Ting Tings, Lady Gaga, Pendulum, Glasvegas, Foals, Yeah Yeah Yeahs, White Lies, Fight Like Apes and God Is an Astronaut.

 Electric Picnic 2009 
 Electric Picnic 2009 took place at Stradbally, County Laois from 4 – 6 September. On Friday 10 October 2008, a limited number of ‘Early Bird’ tickets went on sale at the 2008 price of €199, which included camping. Orbital, The Flaming Lips, Basement Jaxx, Madness, Klaxons, Bell X1, Fleet Foxes and MGMT were amongst the artists who performed.

 Indie-pendence '09 

 Castlepalooza '09 

 Live at the Marquee 

 Cois Fharraige 

 Slane 2009 
 Lord Henry Mountcharles is understood to be in "serious negotiations" with potential acts for Slane in 2009. At the time the concert was due to take place AC/DC would have been in the middle of an 18-month world tour, their first in eight years, making the band one of the favourites to be the headline act. However, on October 14, 2008, the band confirmed a date at the O2, Dublin which cast doubt on such a likelihood. Then, the following day, Oasis confirmed themselves as Slane 2009 headliners. Noel Gallagher and guitarist Gem Archer flew by helicopter  into the County Meath venue for a photoshoot and press conference. The show will take place on Saturday June 20, 2009. Promoter MCD had planned to keep the announcement secret but news was leaked on online bulletin boards and blogs  with media reports beginning to leak the evening before.

 Music awards 

 2009 Meteor Awards 
The 2009 Meteor Awards took place at the RDS in Dublin on 17 March 2009. Below are the winners:

 Choice Music Prize 
The Choice Music Prize for Irish Album of the Year 2008 was awarded to Jape for the album, Ritual, at Vicar Street on 4 March 2009.

 See also 
 2009 in Ireland

 References 

 External links 
 IMRO website
 IRMA website
 Hot Press website
 State website
 MUSE.ie
 CLUAS.com
 News at Phantom FM
 Music at The Irish Times Music at the Irish Independent''
 Music news and album reviews at RTÉ